Old Chapel Hill Cemetery is a graveyard and national historic district located on the campus of the University of North Carolina at Chapel Hill in Chapel Hill, North Carolina.

History
The land was a land grant to the University of North Carolina by the State of North Carolina. The land encompassed , and was sold for five shillings on October 21, 1776. The first recorded burial was George Clarke, a Burke County student at the university, who died September 28, 1798. His headstone was not placed until several years later. By January 28, 1994, 1,621 burials had been performed. The cemetery is now almost full, and all of the plots have already been bought. In 1922, the town took over responsibility for maintaining the cemetery, and in 1988, the ownership changed over to the University.

A low rock wall was built around the cemetery in 1835 at the cost of $64.41. The school officially named the cemetery "College Graveyard," as opposed to "Village Cemetery," like the Chapel Hill residents called it. Five sidewalks divide the cemetery into six sections. Two of the sections were reserved for African-American burials because there were no black church cemeteries in town. A low rock wall divides the two segregated sections (Sections A and B) from the rest. The Dialectic and Philanthropic Societies were the first to establish plots. In the other sections, there are administrators and professors, as well as prominent public officials, business leaders, and artists from the area. During the Civil War, Confederate soldiers were buried there.

There are many different styles of grave markers represented in the cemetery. Many of the early family plots are marked by monuments and obelisks with smaller tablets marking individual graves. There are also uninscribed fieldstones, headstones, ledgers, boxtombs, and tomb-tables in the newer sections. Marble and granite were used most frequently, but stone and concrete can also be found.

The Old Chapel Hill Cemetery is not just a resting place for the deceased. It remains an integral part of campus life. For many students, the quiet, secluded setting is an ideal place to relax or study. Diverse species of trees, such as oaks, hickories, gums, cedars, maples, and pines, create a cover of shade in the cemetery. There are also shrubs, like boxwoods, azaleas, nandinas, and crape myrtles, around many of the plots. During the spring, dogwood trees, azaleas and wisteria make the cemetery one of the most beautiful spots on campus. Some of the individual gravestones are covered by English ivy and vinca. A gazebo has been built between Section B and Section 1 and provides a convenient place to sit.

Vandalism has been a major problem in the cemetery. Whether the culprits are just careless or actually meaning to cause damage, the cemetery has had many tombstones ruined throughout the years. Five 19th century headstones were tipped over and smashed the day before Charles Kuralt was buried in the cemetery. On November 27, 1974, 40 to 50 monuments were broken and pushed off their bases. In 1985, football fans eager to get to a seat damaged stones.

Distinguished persons buried in the cemetery include legendary North Carolina basketball coach Dean Smith; band leader Kay Kyser and his wife, singer Georgia Carroll; playwright Paul Green; novelists Alice Adams and Max Steele; university presidents Frank Porter Graham, Robert Burton House, and William Friday; and CBS newsman Charles Kuralt.

In 2005, the Memorial Grove portion was established to allow space for the spreading of ashes of cremated persons. Names of those whose ashes have been spread in the grove are inscribed upon the Wall of Remembrance. To date, the names of fifteen persons are inscribed on the wall. Some of these persons had been cremated before the opening of the grove. It is assumed that their ashes were originally retained in the care of loved ones.

References

External links

Silent Sentinels of Stone  - information on people buried there and photographs

Cemeteries on the National Register of Historic Places in North Carolina
Historic districts on the National Register of Historic Places in North Carolina
University of North Carolina at Chapel Hill landmarks
1798 establishments in North Carolina
Protected areas of Orange County, North Carolina
Buildings and structures in Chapel Hill-Carrboro, North Carolina
National Register of Historic Places in Orange County, North Carolina
University of North Carolina at Chapel Hill buildings